Howard Earl Bailey Jr. (born March 9, 1980), known professionally as Chingy, is an American rapper. Chingy grew up in St. Louis, Missouri, and began rapping in his late teens. He toured as an opening act with Nelly in the summer of 2002 and then became a protégé of Ludacris, who signed him to his newly formed Disturbing Tha Peace (DTP) record label. The rapper's 2003 summer debut single, "Right Thurr", put him on the musical map as a good-time rapper who specialized in catchy, club-friendly beats and simplistic lyrics delivered in a sing-song, nursery rhyme style.

Chingy's 2003 debut album, Jackpot, sold three million copies, thanks to the boost from "Right Thurr". A second album, Powerballin', was released in 2004 to mixed reviews, and his 2006 release Hoodstar spawned the hit singles "Pullin' Me Back" (featuring Tyrese Gibson) and "Dem Jeans" (featuring Jermaine Dupri). In 2007, his fourth album, Hate It or Love It was released under Disturbing tha Peace, preceded by lead single "Fly Like Me" (featuring Amerie). A studio album, Success & Failure, was released in 2010. In 2018, he made his official debut as a record producer with his single "Sparks Fly" which debuted on July 4, 2018.

Early life 
Chingy grew up in Walnut Park, St. Louis, Missouri, a neighborhood he has referred to as the "Bad Blocks."

He began writing lyrics when he was 9 and was recording raps at 10. He was originally known as H Thugz and was in the St. Louis group Without Warning on 49 Productions with M.G.D. & Mysphit. They recorded "What's Poppin Off" together, which became a local hit. H Thugz and Augustin also recorded a music video for the song. H Thugz later chose the alias Chingy, a slang term for money.

Chingy attended McCluer North High School in Florissant, Missouri, a suburb of St. Louis. During high school, he was known to his friends as "Howie," and he continues to prefer that name from close friends and family.

Music career

2002: Early career 
Ludacris and his manager, Chaka Zulu, were quick to sign Chingy to their fledgling Disturbing Tha Peace label.

2003–2005: Jackpot and Powerballin 
Chingy's debut album Jackpot was released on July 15, 2003, on Disturbing tha Peace. Unable to secure a distribution deal through Def Jam, Ludacris negotiated a deal to distribute the album through Capitol Records. Guest appearances included Ludacris, Snoop Dogg, Murphy Lee, I-20, Raindrop, Tity Boi of Playaz Circle, Trina, and Jermaine Dupri. Fueled by "Right Thurr", Jackpot produced the hit "One Call Away" featuring J-Weav and "Holidae In" featuring Snoop Dogg and Ludacris. The album was produced by St. Louis production crew The Trak Starz. The album was received well by critics. Within a year of the release of Jackpot, It was certified Platinum by the RIAA. The up-tempo Southern hip hop track "Right Thurr" gained popularity, peaking at number two on the Billboard Hot 100.

Chingy released his second album, Powerballin', on November 16, 2004, through Slot-A-Lot Records and Capitol Records. The album peaked at #10 on the charts and featured the hit single "Balla Baby." The album featured guest appearances from artists R. Kelly, Bun B, Lil Wayne, Lil Flip, Janet Jackson, David Banner, Nate Dogg, and Get It Boyz. Powerballin sold over one million copies and received a Platinum certification by the RIAA on March 21, 2005. He also was on one of the George Lopez episodes as himself. The eighth song from his album "I Do" is featured on the soundtrack for the smash hit 2004 video game Need for Speed: Underground 2.

 2006–2008: Hood Star and Hate It or Love It 
Hoodstar is Chingy's third album, released on September 19, 2006. The album featured Mr. Collipark, longtime collaborator Jermaine Dupri, Timbaland, and Mannie Fresh. His summer single, "Pullin Me Back" (featuring actor-R&B singer Tyrese), would find him back on top on the Hot Rap Tracks chart and help Hoodstar debut at number eight on the album chart, but the follow-up single "Dem Jeans", featuring Jermaine Dupri, fared worse although the album did go gold. Other singles from Hoodstar were "Brand New Kicks" and "Hands Up".

Unhappy with the way he felt Capitol was promoting their urban artists, in 2007 Chingy jumped ship and returned to DTP Records, which was by-then a part of the Def Jam family. When asked upon this move, the St. Louis rapper said: "I don't think Capitol really knew how to work urban artists, They're really stuck on pop and they didn't know how to market me."

Hate It or Love It is Chingy's fourth studio album. The album featured production from Scott Storch, Timbaland, and Cool and Dre. The lead single is "Fly Like Me", featuring Amerie. The album was released on December 18, 2007, and featured appearances by Ludacris, Bobby Valentino, Steph Jones, Trey Songz, Rick Ross, and Anthony Hamilton. The album debuted at #84 on the Billboard 200, selling 30,000 copies, making it Chingy's first album not to crack the Top 10. Hate It or Love It was not released in the UK, marking Chingy's first album not to be released in the country.

 2009–2012: No Risk, No Reward 
In 2012 Chingy announced he was working on his fifth studio album called No Risk No Reward,  DTP  which was set to be released sometime in 2012, but as of June 2016  continues to be delayed due to lack of funding. "Superhero", featuring Full Dekk Music Group's artist Chris Woodhouse, was purported to be the first single from the album. Chingy then announced that he would be releasing a mixtape, Jackpot Back, which was released March 3, 2012.

 2013–2016: "King Judah" and "Watch The World" 
In Spring 2013, Chingy announced that he had become a practicing Black Hebrew Israelite and released the music video for "King Judah". This was Chingy's attempt to follow a moral agenda and denouncing mainstream rap. Currently Chingy is working on his upcoming EP album entitled Chingology which was released later this year.

Major media outlets in Australia and NZ leaked information about a new Chingy collaboration, "Watch The World", featuring New Zealand based Asian model/singer Lucy X (Lucy Xu) . The track produced by ChristopherKris (Kris Lal) is rumored to be featured on an upcoming compilation album released in 2014. The single was released on November 1, 2013, to iTunes and radio. The song reached #2 on the iTunes Urban chart in both countries, with a video to follow in the coming months.

 2017-present: Signing To Bungalo Records 

Chingy signed to Universal Music Group distributed label Bungalo Records, making it his 3rd time recording under the Universal umbrella. In 2019, Chingy will participate in the "Millenium Tour" with B2K.

In 2021 Chingy headlined a tour the United States with R&B singers Mýa and Ginuwine.

 Other ventures 

 Full Dekk Music Group Full Dekk Music Group''', formerly known as Slot-A-Lot Records, is founded by rapper Chingy and manager Stan Wright in 2004, while Bailey was signed to Capitol Records.

Current artists
 Chingy (Co-founder & CEO)
 Chris Woodhouse
 SmallTalk
 M.C.
 Don Trip
 DJ Noize
 Mr 915 Lil Bit
 L Frost
 Young Swift
 Krisstle
 Soulo

 “Catch” Cologne 
In early 2022, he announced that his first ever cologne was in the process of being completed and packaged. He appeared on the online platform TalkShopLive in September 2022 to promote and officially sell the cologne for the first time.

 Discography 

 Jackpot (2003)
 Powerballin' (2004)
 Hoodstar (2006)
 Hate It or Love It (2007)
 Success & Failure (2010)

 Filmography 

 Acting career 

In 2005, Chingy made his acting debut in the TV comedy series My Wife and Kids. The same year, Chingy acted in the TV comedies One on One and George Lopez. In 2006, Chingy made a cameo in the comedy film Scary Movie 4, as well as on TV series Yo Momma. In 2010, Chingy had a role in the film Speed-Dating''.

Film

Television

References

External links 

Truly Hollywood Interview (Jan. 5, 2007)

1980 births
Living people
African-American businesspeople
African-American Christians
African-American male actors
African-American male rappers
American male television actors
American music industry executives
Black Hebrew Israelite people
Businesspeople from Missouri
Capitol Records artists
Def Jam Recordings artists
Male actors from Missouri
Midwest hip hop musicians
Pop rappers
Rappers from St. Louis
People from St. Louis County, Missouri
21st-century American rappers
21st-century American male musicians
21st-century African-American musicians
20th-century African-American people